The Markersbach Pumped Storage Power Plant is a hydroelectric power station utilizing pumped-storage technology in Markersbach, Germany. Planning for the power plant began in 1961, construction began in 1970 and the generators were commissioned in 1979. The power station generates electricity by moving water between an upper and lower reservoir. When energy demand is high, the water is released back down towards the lower reservoir and fed through six 174.25 MW reversible Francis pump turbines, the same machines that pumped the water to the upper reservoir. The installed capacity of the power plant is 1,045 MW.

See also

References

Dams completed in 1979
Energy infrastructure completed in 1979
Pumped-storage hydroelectric power stations in Germany
Dams in Saxony
Reservoirs in Saxony